Kašići (Cyrillic: Кашићи) is a settlement in the municipality of Konjic, Bosnia and Herzegovina, and the north-western hamlet of the village of Glavatičevo.

Demographics 
According to the 2013 census, its population was 49.

References

Populated places in Konjic
Glavatičevo